Elitzur Ironi Netanya is a professional basketball club based in Netanya, Israel. The team plays in the Liga Leumit.

History

Elitzur Netanya (1959–1998)
Elizur Netanya was promoted to the first league in 1985. In their first season, the team qualified for the playoff finals against Maccabi Tel Aviv but lost both games in the Playoffs. Among the most prominent stars of Elitzur Netanya were: Willie Sims, Carl Neverson, Terry Fair, Danny Bracha and Jimmy Hall. In their second season in the first division, the team finished in fourth place. In their third season, the team qualified for the Israeli Basketball State Cup finals, but the team was defeated by Hapoel Galil Elyon.

In the 1988–89 season, the team struggled against the relegation to the second division, but finally the team finished in tenth place and secured their place in the first division. However, the team could not open the next season and in fact did not appear at all due to heavy debts and the team relegated to the lower leagues. In total, the team played for four consecutive seasons (1985–1989) in the first division.

Barak Netanya (1998–2005)
At the end of the 1998 season, Elitzur was merged with Maccabi Netanya and renamed "Elizur Maccabi Natanya". One year later, they decided to add to the club's title the name "Barak", following a plane crash incident of Netanya's fan - Zvi Barak, who entered into coma.

From 2000 to 2006, Netanya climbed back from League A (Fourth-tier division) to the Liga Leumit (Second-tier division). In the 2006–07 season, the team was close to promote to the Israeli Basketball Premier League but they were eliminated by Elitzur Kiryat Ata in a playoff series for the third place leading to the Premier League.

In the 2007–08 season, Netanya led the Liga Leumit's table, losing only one game during the regular season. In the playoffs, They defeated Hapoel Tivon, Hod Hasharon and Hapoel Afula in the Playoffs and was promoted back to the Premier League.

In the 2009–10 season, Netanya reached the Israeli League Final Four as the fifth seed. Netanya defeated Maccabi Haifa 3–1 in the Quarterfinals, but eventually they lost to Maccabi Tel Aviv in the Semifinals.

In the 2010–11 season, Netanya reached the 2011 Israeli State Cup Finals, but they lost to Maccabi Tel Aviv.

In the summer of 2014, Netanya was relegated to Liga Leumit due to financial difficulties.

In the 2014–2015 season, Netanya finished the Liga Leumit regular season as fifth seed, but they were eliminated in the playoff semifinals by Ironi Kiryat Ata.

On July 21, 2015, Barak Netanya was dissolved due to financial issues.

Elitzur cosmos real estate Netanya (2016–present)
In the summer of 2016, the team was re-established and changed their name to "Elizur cosmos real estate  Netanya" and played in the Liga Artzit.

In the 2016–17 season, Netanya led the Liga Artzit's and reached the finals, but they eventually lost to Maccabi Kiryat Motzkin.

In the 2017–18 season, Netanya was promoted to the Liga Leumit after they defeated A.S. Ramat Hasharon 2-1 in the finals.

In 2021, Netanya was promoted to the Israeli Basketball Premier League, after placing the top two places of the 2020–21 National League.

Roster

Notable players

Former managers
 Ralf Klein
 Zvika Sherf
 Danny Franco
 Eric Alfasi

Honours
Domestic Championship:
Runners-up (1): 1985–86
Domestic Cup:
Runners-up (2): 1987–88, 2010–11

Lower division competitions 
Liga Leumit: 
Champions (1): 2008–09
Regular season champions (2): 2007–08, 2008–09
Liga Artzit  
Winners: 2005 , 2018 
Association Cup:
Champions (1): 2009

References

External links
 Profile on Eurobasket.com

Israeli Basketball Premier League teams
Basketball teams in Israel
Basketball teams established in 1959
1959 establishments in Israel